Stangeavisa (The Stange Gazette) is a local Norwegian newspaper published once a week in Stange in Hedmark county. The newspaper covers events in the municipality of Stange. The paper is edited by Lars Kristian Seierstad, who is also the single shareholder in the publishing company. The newspaper was established in 2004.

Circulation
According to the Norwegian Audit Bureau of Circulations and National Association of Local Newspapers, Stangeavisa has had the following annual circulation:
2005: 1,253
2006: 1,463
2007: 2,007
2008: 2,516
2009: 2,788
2010: 2,820
2011: 2,692
2012: 2,752
2013: 2,632
2014: 2,651
2015: 2,569
2016: 2,577

References

External links
Stangeavisa homepage

Newspapers published in Norway
Norwegian-language newspapers
Stange
Mass media in Hedmark
Publications established in 2004
2004 establishments in Norway